The  Junior Sport Leadership Award was a qualification run in the United Kingdom by the British Sports Trust, the operating name of Sports Leaders UK.

References

External links
British Sports Trust

Children's sport in the United Kingdom